Gustavo Faris (born 17 February 1962) is an Argentine former cyclist. He competed in the sprint event at the 1988 Summer Olympics.

References

External links
 

1962 births
Living people
Argentine male cyclists
Olympic cyclists of Argentina
Cyclists at the 1988 Summer Olympics
Place of birth missing (living people)